Matteo Viola was the defending champion but chose not to compete.
Matthew Ebden won his third Challenger of the year over Japan's Go Soeda.

Seeds

Draw

Finals

Top half

Bottom half

References
 Main Draw
 Qualifying Draw

Keio Challenger - Singles
2013 Singles
2013 Keio Challenger